Panga is  the common South African name for Pterogymnus laniarius, a small, ocean-dwelling fish.

Panga may also refer to:

Biology
Basa (fish) or Pangasius bocourti, a species of catfish
Iridescent shark or Pangasius hypophthalmus, a species of shark catfish
Millettia stuhlmannii or panga panga, a species of timber tree

Places
Mto Panga, a settlement in Kenya
Panga, Burkina Faso, town in Comoé Province, Burkina Faso
Panga, Kirtipur, a settlement in Nepal
Panga, Lääne County, village in Ridala Parish, Lääne County, Estonia
Panga, Saare County, village in Mustjala Parish, Saare County, Estonia
Panga Posht, a village in Gilan Province, Iran

Boats
 Panga, an alternate Spanish spelling of Bangka (boat), traditional outrigger canoes from the Philippines
 
Panga (skiff), a flat-bottomed fishing boat common in developing countries that was originally developed by the Yamaha Corporation in the 1970s

Other uses
Operation Panga, a 1971 military operation launched by the Rhodesian Security Forces against the communist insurgent group, ZIPRA
Panga Cliff, a coastal cliff located near Panga in Saare County, Estonia
PangaeaPanga or Alex Tan (born 1996), American ROM hacker and tool-assisted speedrunner
Panga (knife), a large cutting tool in East and Southern Africa
Panga (film), a 2020 Indian Hindi-language sports drama film